Albert Hendrickx (19 July 1916 – 13 May 1990) was a Belgian racing cyclist. He rode in the 1936 Tour de France.

References

1916 births
1990 deaths
Belgian male cyclists
Place of birth missing